Phyllis Morris may refer to:
 Phyllis Morris (furniture designer)
 Phyllis Morris (actress)